According to Strabo, the Artabri (or Arrotrebae) were an ancient Gallaecian Celtic tribe, living in the extreme north-west of modern Galicia, about Cape Nerium (Cabo Prior), outskirts of the city and port of Ferrol, where in Roman times, in the 1st century BC, a fishing port existed which also trade in metals (like Silver, Gold, Tin and Iron ) as well as wild horses in the bay of Ferrol most likely administered from nearby Nerium (Modern day Narahio famous for its medieval castle and cape Nerium modern day Cape Prior) in an area dominated by the Artabri (or Arrotrebae) ) giving name to the Portus Magnus Artabrorum (Form not just by the bay of Ferrol but the three rias of Ferrol, Betanzos and Corunna). Strabo reports several seaports among the Artabri. Ptolemy  places them among Galaeci Lucenses and gives their capital town as Lucus Augusti (now Lugo).

See also 
Pre-Roman peoples of the Iberian Peninsula

Notes

External links 
Detailed map of the Pre-Roman Peoples of Iberia (around 200 BC)

Tribes of Gallaecia
Galician Celtic tribes